Carmentina molybdotoma is a species of sedge moths in the genus Carmentina. It was described by Alexey Diakonoff and Yutaka Arita in 1979. It is found in Japan.

References

External links
 Carmentina molybdotoma at Zipcodezoo.com

Moths described in 1979
Glyphipterigidae
Moths of Japan